Christian Fouchet (17 November 1911 – 11 August 1974) was a French politician.

Biography
He was born in Saint-Germain-en-Laye, Yvelines. He was a graduate of the Ecole des sciences politiques.

After Marshal Petain's request for an armistice with Nazi Germany on 17 June 1940, Fouchet boarded a London-bound British airplane to offer his services to General Charles de Gaulle and the Free French forces. His missions primarily involved liaison work between the Free French in London and the resistance movement in France.

Fouchet received his first diplomatic assignment in 1944, when he was made a secretary of the French embassy in Moscow. In 1945 he represented de Gaulle's provisional government in Poland. He subsequently served as Consul General in India until 1947.

In 1954 Fouchet began a two-year term as Minister for Moroccan and Tunisian Affairs in the government of Pierre Mendès France. He was the French ambassador to Denmark from 1958 to 1962.

He was the French Minister of National Education from 28 November 1962 to 6 April 1967. He was the last French colonial head of Algeria from 19 March 1962 to 3 July 1962. He was the French Minister of the Interior from 6 April 1967 to 31 May 1968.

He is the father of the French novelist Lorraine Fouchet.

Fouchet held the Legion of Honour as a chevalier in 1946 and as a commandeur in 1961, the Croix de Guerre, the Croix de la Valeur Militaire, the Croix of the Veterans of Foreign Wars, the Medal of the Resistance and the Medal of Free France.

References

1911 births
1974 deaths
People from Saint-Germain-en-Laye
Politicians from Île-de-France
Rally of the French People politicians
Union for the New Republic politicians
Union of Democrats for the Republic politicians
French interior ministers
French Ministers of National Education
Deputies of the 2nd National Assembly of the French Fourth Republic
Deputies of the 3rd National Assembly of the French Fifth Republic
Deputies of the 4th National Assembly of the French Fifth Republic
Deputies of the 5th National Assembly of the French Fifth Republic
Ambassadors of France to Denmark
Free French military personnel of World War II
French people of the Algerian War
Burials at Père Lachaise Cemetery